The 1953–54 NBA season was the Royals sixth season in the NBA.

Regular season

Season standings

x – clinched playoff spot

Record vs. opponents

Game log

Playoffs

|- align="center" bgcolor="#ccffcc"
| 1
| March 16
| Fort Wayne
| W 82–75
| Bobby Wanzer (18)
| Edgerton Park Arena
| 1–0
|- align="center" bgcolor="#ffcccc"
| 2
| March 17
| @ Minneapolis
| L 88–109
| Arnie Risen (21)
| Minneapolis Auditorium
| 1–1
|- align="center" bgcolor="#ccffcc"
| 3
| March 21
| @ Fort Wayne
| W 89–71
| Bobby Wanzer (14)
| War Memorial Coliseum
| 2–1
|-

|- align="center" bgcolor="#ffcccc"
| 1
| March 24
| @ Minneapolis
| L 76–89
| Wanzer, Coleman (17)
| Minneapolis Auditorium
| 0–1
|- align="center" bgcolor="#ccffcc"
| 2
| March 27
| Minneapolis
| W 74–73
| Bobby Wanzer (16)
| Edgerton Park Arena
| 1–1
|- align="center" bgcolor="#ffcccc"
| 3
| March 28
| @ Minneapolis
| L 72–82
| Arnie Risen (24)
| Minneapolis Auditorium
| 1–2
|-

Player statistics

Season

Playoffs

Awards and records
 Bobby Wanzer, All-NBA Second Team

References

Sacramento Kings seasons
Rochester
Rochester Royals
Rochester Royals